Donovan Mitchell Jr. (born September 7, 1996) is an American professional basketball player for the Cleveland Cavaliers of the National Basketball Association (NBA). Nicknamed "Spida", he was drafted in the first round of the 2017 NBA draft with the 13th overall pick. He is a four-time NBA All-Star.

Mitchell played college basketball for the Louisville Cardinals, earning first-team all-conference honors in the Atlantic Coast Conference (ACC) in 2017. As a rookie with the Utah Jazz, he was named to the NBA All-Rookie First Team and won the Slam Dunk Contest in 2018. He was traded from the Jazz to the Cavaliers in 2022.

Early life
Mitchell was born on September 7, 1996, to parents Donovan Sr. and Nicole in Elmsford, New York. His mother, who is of Panamanian descent, is a teacher and his father is a former Minor League Baseball player. With his father serving as a director of player relations for the New York Mets, Mitchell spent his childhood around Major League Baseball locker rooms. At seven years old, he looked up to star pitcher of the Mets' minor-league system Scott Kazmir and later to David Wright, who was the first poster he hung on his wall. Mitchell has one younger sister named Jordan. He played AAU basketball for both The City and the Riverside Hawks programs out of New York City. In 2010, Mitchell was present at the Boys and Girls Club of Greenwich (Conn.) when LeBron James announced his decision to sign with the Miami Heat.

High school career
Mitchell attended Canterbury School in New Milford for his first two years of high school, after having graduated from Greenwich Country Day School likewise in Connecticut. Besides basketball, Mitchell played baseball for Canterbury. Yet his high school baseball career ended in his sophomore year after incurring injury; dashing for a pop-up in the infield, Mitchell collided with a catcher, who suffered a broken jaw while he received a broken wrist as a result. It also ended his upcoming AAU season. For his junior and senior years, his mother transferred him to Brewster Academy in Wolfeboro, New Hampshire. Making basketball his focus and availing of Brewster's nationally prominent program, Mitchell garnered considerably more attention from college basketball coaches. He quickly proved popular among his new schoolmates; so much so, he ran for senior prefect at the end of his junior year. He also acted in the school musical and gave tours to visiting students in his role as a member of the Gold Key Club. He won two prep school national championships with Brewster's team. As he would later do in college, Mitchell spent his summers playing in streetball games at the famed Rucker Park in New York City. At an event sponsored by Under Armour on a Brooklyn basketball court, he did a dunk that went on to be featured on Sports Center. Mitchell was invited to play in the regional game for the Jordan Brand Classic, ranking twenty-seventh in the 2015 class by one recruiting service and forty-third by another. He committed to the University of Louisville to play college basketball.

College career

Mitchell opted to wear number 45 on his jersey in appreciation for Michael Jordan, who took the same number during his baseball career and the early part of his NBA comeback in 1995. As a freshman at the University of Louisville, Mitchell started in no more than five games and averaged 7.4 points, 1.7 assists, and 3.4 rebounds for the season.

Over his sophomore season, Mitchell averaged 15.6 points, 2.7 assists, and 4.9 rebounds per game, while shooting 46.3 percent from the floor as well as 35.4 from behind the arc and 80.6 percent from the free-throw line. He was named to the First Team All-Atlantic Coast Conference. Though he did not immediately hire an agent, Mitchell declared for the 2017 NBA draft on the heels of his sophomore campaign.

Professional career

Utah Jazz (2017–2022)

2017–18 season: Rookie season

Mitchell was drafted by the Denver Nuggets with the 13th overall pick in the 2017 NBA draft only to be traded to the Utah Jazz for the 24th pick (Tyler Lydon) and Trey Lyles. On July 5, 2017, Mitchell signed a four-year rookie scale contract with the Jazz. On July 11, 2017, Mitchell signed a multi-year shoe deal with Adidas. Later that day, Mitchell scored 37 points against the Memphis Grizzlies in the 2017 NBA Summer League in Las Vegas, the most by any player during the 2017 NBA Summer League. In his NBA debut on October 18, 2017, Mitchell registered 10 points and four assists against the Denver Nuggets. On December 1, 2017, he scored a career-high 41 points in a 114–108 win over the New Orleans Pelicans. He set the Jazz scoring record for a rookie and became the first NBA rookie to score 40 points in a game since Blake Griffin in 2011. He surpassed Darrell Griffith's team-record 38 in 1981. Mitchell also became the seventh rookie in franchise history to have a 30-plus point game, as well as the first to have a 40-plus point game. On January 4, 2018, Mitchell was named the Western Conference Rookie of the Month for December 2017 after averaging 23.1 points, 3.4 assists, 3.2 rebounds, and 1.8 steals in 34.3 minutes per game during the month of December. On January 15, 2018, Mitchell surpassed Karl Malone for most 20+ points games during a rookie season when he had his 19th 20+ point game. On February 2, 2018 Donovan recorded his second 40-point game of his rookie season against the Phoenix Suns, becoming the first rookie guard to notch two 40-point games since Allen Iverson in 1996–97. On February 5, 2018, Donovan was named by the NBA as an injury replacement for Orlando Magic forward Aaron Gordon (strained left hip flexor) for the 2018 NBA Slam Dunk Contest. He won the contest scoring a 48 and 50 in the first round, then a 50 and 48 in the final round being the first rookie to win the contest since Zach LaVine. On March 1, 2018, Mitchell was named as the Western Conference Rookie of the month for the third time that season for games played in February. On April 10, he set a rookie record for most three-pointers in a season with 186 three-pointers during a 119–79 win over the Golden State Warriors. On April 12, at the end of the regular season, Mitchell was named Western Conference Rookie of the Month for March and April.

In Mitchell's playoff debut against the Oklahoma City Thunder on April 15, he recorded 27 points, 10 rebounds, and three assists. He bruised his foot during the game and was questionable for Game 2, but was able to play, scoring 28 points, including 13 in the fourth quarter to lead the Jazz to a 102–95 win. Mitchell set a new record for points by a shooting guard in the team's first two postseason games with 55 points, breaking Michael Jordan's record of 53 points. Mitchell led the Jazz to a 4–2 series win over the Thunder, averaging 28.5 points a game on 46.2 percent shooting. His 171 points in the series were the third-most ever by a rookie in his first six playoff games, behind only Kareem Abdul-Jabbar and Wilt Chamberlain. His 38 points in Game 6 (on 14-of-26 shooting) marked the highest scoring output by a rookie in a series-clinching win since 1980. On May 22, 2018, he was named to the NBA All-Rookie First Team.

2018–19 season: Sophomore season

On October 24, 2018, Mitchell scored a season-high 38 points in a 100–89 win over the Houston Rockets. On January 25, 2019, Mitchell recorded his first and only double-double of the season, with 24 points and 11 assists, in a 106–102 victory over the Minnesota Timberwolves Mitchell recorded a total of five 30-point games in the month of January, including three consecutive such games, earning him Western Conference Player of the Week for the week of January 6–13. On February 22, Mitchell tied his season-high 38 points in a 148–147 double overtime loss to the Oklahoma City Thunder. On March 2, Mitchell scored a career-high 46 points in 115–111 win over the Milwaukee Bucks. Six days later, Mitchell once again recorded 38 points in a 114–104 loss to the Memphis Grizzlies. On March 29, Mitchell scored 35 points in a 128–124 victory over the Washington Wizards. On April 9, Mitchell tied his career-high 46 points in the regular season finale, as the Jazz topped the Denver Nuggets, 118–108.

The Jazz would once again be eliminated in the postseason by the Rockets in five games, this time in the first round. Mitchell struggled mightily in the first two games, being held to just 19 and 11 points respectively. He scored 34 points in the 104–101 loss in Game 3, before scoring 31 points in Game 4, the lone Utah victory.

2019–20 season: First All-Star selection
Mitchell opened the 2019–20 season with a 32-point, 12-assist performance in a 105–95 win over the Oklahoma City Thunder on October 23, 2019. On November 3, Mitchell scored a then season-high 36 points in a 105–94 loss to the Los Angeles Clippers. On November 23, he surpassed that season-high with 37 points in a 128–120 victory over the New Orleans Pelicans. On December 28, Mitchell recorded 30 points, seven rebounds, and nine assists in a 120–107 win over the Clippers. On January 16, 2020, Mitchell tied his career-high 46 points in a 138–132 overtime loss to the Pelicans. On January 30, Mitchell was named an All-Star for the first time in his career, being selected as a Western Conference reserve for the 2019 NBA All-Star Game. On February 24, Mitchell scored 38 points in a 131–111 loss to the Phoenix Suns, before scoring 37 points two days later, in a 114–103 loss to the Boston Celtics.

On March 11, 2020, Mitchell and teammate Rudy Gobert tested positive for COVID-19, resulting in the NBA suspending its season. The league was later reinstated within the NBA Bubble four months later, where the Jazz obtained the sixth seed and faced the Denver Nuggets in the first round. On August 17, 2020, Mitchell scored 57 points in a 125–135 overtime loss to the Nuggets, the third most in playoff history. Six days later, he scored 51 points to join Michael Jordan and Allen Iverson as the only players to score 50 or more points twice in a playoff series.

During the shortened 2020 off-season, Mitchell signed a five-year rookie extension with the Jazz, paying him at least $163 million with an incentivized maximum of $195 million.

2020–21 season: Best record in the NBA
On February 23, 2021, Mitchell was named a Western Conference reserve for the 2021 NBA All-Star Game, marking his second consecutive All-Star selection. Despite a mid-April ankle sprain against the Indiana Pacers, which would sideline Mitchell for the final sixteen games of the regular season, the Jazz finished with the NBA’s top seed and home-court advantage throughout the entire postseason for the first time since 1997–98.

After defeating the Memphis Grizzlies in the First Round in five games, Utah would advance to play the Los Angeles Clippers in the Conference Semi-Finals, where in Game 1, Mitchell would score 45 points in a 112–109 victory. He followed that performance with a 37-point outing in Game 2, as Utah topped the Clippers 117–111 en route to a 2–0 series lead. Mitchell had a huge Game 6 with 39 points, nine rebounds, and nine assists on 12-of-27 shooting (9-of-15 from three) despite being questionable with an ankle injury. The Jazz were eliminated after their fourth straight loss to Clippers.

2021–22 season: Final season in Utah
On February 3, 2022, Mitchell was named a Western Conference reserve for the 2022 NBA All-Star Game, marking his third consecutive All-Star selection. On April 16, during Game 1 of the first round of the playoffs, he logged 32 points, six rebounds, and six assists in a 99–93 win over the Dallas Mavericks. Utah would go on to lose to Dallas in six games despite Mitchell’s 23-point, 8-rebound and 9-assist outing in a tightly contested 98–96 loss in Game 6. After another playoff disappointment, the Jazz decided to trade both Mitchell and Gobert in the off-season.

Cleveland Cavaliers (2022–present)
On September 1, 2022, Mitchell was traded to the Cleveland Cavaliers for Lauri Markkanen, Collin Sexton, and Ochai Agbaji, three first round picks, and two pick swaps. He made his regular season debut on October 19, putting up 31 points and nine assists in a 108–105 loss to the Toronto Raptors. On October 28, Mitchell scored 41 points in a 132–123 overtime win over the Boston Celtics. He and teammate Caris LeVert each had 41 points. The last time the Cavaliers had multiple 40-point scorers was Game 5 of the 2016 NBA Finals, when LeBron James and Kyrie Irving both had 41. The next game, Mitchell had a career-high 12 assists and scored 38 points in a 121–108 win over the New York Knicks. On December 6, Mitchell scored 43 points on 17-of-27 shooting from the field in a 116–102 win over the Los Angeles Lakers.

On January 2, 2023, Mitchell scored an NBA season-high, career-high, and Cavaliers-record 71 points, along with eight rebounds and 11 assists, in a 145–134 overtime win over the Chicago Bulls. It was the highest-scoring game for any NBA player since Kobe Bryant's 81-point game in 2006. Mitchell became the seventh player in NBA history to score 70 or more points in a game, and the first to do so with at least 10 assists. On January 26, Mitchell was named an Eastern Conference starter for the 2023 NBA All-Star Game, marking his fourth consecutive selection and first one as a starter.

Career statistics

NBA

Regular season

|-
| style="text-align:left;"|
| style="text-align:left;"|Utah
| 79 || 71 || 33.4 || .437 || .340 || .805 || 3.7 || 3.7 || 1.5 || .3 || 20.5
|-
| style="text-align:left;"|
| style="text-align:left;"|Utah
| 77 || 77 || 33.7 || .432 || .362 || .806 || 4.1 || 4.2 || 1.4 || .4 || 23.8
|-
| style="text-align:left;"|
| style="text-align:left;"|Utah
| 69 || 69 || 34.3 || .449 || .366 || .863 || 4.4 || 4.3 || 1.0 || .2 || 24.0
|-
| style="text-align:left;"|
| style="text-align:left;"|Utah
| 53 || 53 || 33.4 || .438 || .386 || .845 || 4.4 || 5.2 || 1.0 || .3 || 26.4
|-
| style="text-align:left;"|
| style="text-align:left;"|Utah
| 67 || 67 || 33.8 || .448 || .355 || .853 || 4.2 || 5.3 || 1.5 || .2 || 25.9
|- class="sortbottom"
| style="text-align:center;" colspan="2"|Career
| 345 || 337 || 33.7 || .441 || .361 || .833 || 4.2 || 4.5 || 1.3 || .3 || 23.9
|- class="sortbottom"
| style="text-align:center;" colspan="2"|All-Star
| 3 || 1 || 24.2 || .511 || .414 || 1.000 || 4.3 || 6.0 || 2.0 || .3 || 20.7

Playoffs

|-
| style="text-align:left;"|2018
| style="text-align:left;"|Utah
| 11 || 11 || 37.4 || .420 || .313 || .907 || 5.9 || 4.2 || 1.5 || .4 || 24.4
|-
| style="text-align:left;"|2019
| style="text-align:left;"|Utah
| 5 || 5 || 38.6 || .321 || .256 || .727 || 5.0 || 3.2 || 1.6 || .2 || 21.4
|-
| style="text-align:left;"|2020
| style="text-align:left;"|Utah
| 7 || 7 || 37.7 || .529 || .516 || .948 || 5.0 || 4.9 || 1.0 || .3 || style="background:#cfecec;"| 36.3*
|-
| style="text-align:left;"|2021
| style="text-align:left;"|Utah
| 10 || 10 || 34.6 || .447 || .435 || .829 || 4.2 || 5.5 || 1.1 || .2 || 32.3
|-
| style="text-align:left;"|2022
| style="text-align:left;"|Utah
| 6 || 6 || 38.2 || .398 || .208 || .881 || 4.3 || 5.7 || .7 || .5 || 25.5
|- class="sortbottom"
| style="text-align:center;" colspan="2"|Career
| 39 || 39 || 37.0 || .431 || .369 || .865 || 4.9 || 4.7 || 1.2 || .3 || 28.3

College

|-
| style="text-align:left;"|2015–16
| style="text-align:left;"|Louisville
| 31 || 5 || 19.1 || .442 || .250 || .754 || 3.4 || 1.7 || .8 || .1 || 7.4
|-
| style="text-align:left;"|2016–17
| style="text-align:left;"|Louisville
| 34 || 33 || 32.3 || .408 || .354 || .806 || 4.9 || 2.7 || 2.1 || .5 || 15.6
|- class="sortbottom"
| style="text-align:center;" colspan="2"|Career
| 65 || 38 || 26.0 || .418 || .329 || .788 || 4.1 || 2.2 || 1.5 || .3 || 11.7

Personal life
During the 2017–18 NBA season, Mitchell appeared on the cover of Slam and starred in a documentary called Rookie on the Rise. The docu-series follows Mitchell on his race for the Rookie of the Year.

Mitchell is a fan of the New York Mets and frequently attends games during the off-season. Mitchell's father, Donovan Sr., has worked for the Mets for over twenty years.

See also
 List of National Basketball Association single-game scoring leaders
 List of National Basketball Association single-game playoff scoring leaders

References

External links

 Louisville Cardinals bio

1996 births
Living people
2019 FIBA Basketball World Cup players
African-American basketball players
American men's basketball players
American sportspeople of Panamanian descent
Basketball players from Connecticut
Basketball players from New York (state)
Brewster Academy alumni
Canterbury School (Connecticut) alumni
Cleveland Cavaliers players
Denver Nuggets draft picks
Louisville Cardinals men's basketball players
National Basketball Association All-Stars
People from Greenburgh, New York
People from New Milford, Connecticut
Shooting guards
Sportspeople from Westchester County, New York
United States men's national basketball team players
Utah Jazz players
21st-century African-American sportspeople
African-American history of Westchester County, New York